Strong tie may refer to:

 Simpson Strong Tie, a subsidiary and brand of structural hardware produced by the Simpson Manufacturing Company
 Interpersonal ties, in sociology